Ponson may refer to:

Places 
Ponson Island, an island located in the province of Cebu
Carcen-Ponson, a commune in south-western France
Ponson-Dessus, a commune in south-western France
Ponson-Debat-Pouts, a commune in south-western France

People 
Sidney Ponson, former Major League Baseball pitcher
Édouard Debat-Ponsan, a French academic painter